Ammotrophus is a genus of echinoderms belonging to the family Clypeasteridae.

The species of this genus are found in Australia.

Species:

Ammotrophus arachnoides 
Ammotrophus crassus 
Ammotrophus cyclius 
Ammotrophus platyterus

References

Clypeasteridae
Echinoidea genera
Echinoderms of Oceania